Back to the Future Now: Live at Arizona Charlie's, Las Vegas is the third live album by American country band Asleep at the Wheel. Recorded on December 6 and 7, 1996 at Arizona Charlie's Decatur in Las Vegas, Nevada, it was produced by the band's frontman Ray Benson with Blake Chancey and released on May 20, 1997 by Sony Music imprint Lucky Dog. The album did not chart, spawned no single releases, and received mixed reviews from critics.

Asleep at the Wheel recorded Back to the Future Now at two shows on the tour in promotion of 1995's The Wheel Keeps on Rollin'. The album marks the debut of new members Jason Roberts and Chris Booher on fiddles, the latter of whom had recently taken over from Tim Alexander on piano (who features as a guest). Also featured are several former members of the group, including vocalists LeRoy Preston, Chris O'Connell, and steel guitarist Lucky Oceans.

Background
In early 1997, Asleep at the Wheel signed as one of the first two artists (alongside David Allan Coe) on Lucky Dog, an imprint label set up by Sony Music in Nashville, Tennessee for "older [country] acts and new roots artists". Back to the Future Now: Live at Arizona Charlie's, Las Vegas was issued as the label's first release on May 20, 1997. The album was recorded over the course of two shows on December 6 and 7, 1996 at Arizona Charlie's Decatur in Las Vegas, Nevada, tracked directly to a Sonic Studio remote recording station. It was produced by frontman Ray Benson with Blake Chancey, a co-founder of Lucky Dog. No singles were released from the album, but a music video was issued for "Boogie Back to Texas" directed by Dan Karlok, in which the band "cruises around various parts of the U.S. in its tour bus".

Speaking about the album in an interview with Los Angeles Times, Benson noted that "What I wanted to do this time was make a live record of all the songs that have come to be identified with us over the last 27 years, with the people who were identified with the songs ... Then I wanted to add the new people and do some new things because we have been described by a lot of people as our forte being the live show." The shows recorded for Back to the Future Now featured six former members of the band making guest appearances: vocalist and rhythm guitarist LeRoy Preston, pedal steel guitarist Lucky Oceans, vocalist Chris O'Connell, bassist Tony Garnier, and pianists Floyd Domino and Tim Alexander. The album is also the band's first to feature fiddler and mandolinist Jason Roberts, and pianist and fiddler Chris Booher.

Reception

Critical reviews for Back to the Future Now were mixed. Billboard wrote that "this is the kind of kick-ass, feel-good music you hardly hear anymore outside the dance hall circuit," describing the album as "Great stuff". AllMusic's William Ruhlmann dubbed the album "a good primer of Asleep at the Wheel", although suggested that the release of another live record was "redundant". Similarly, Jerry Sharpe of the Pittsburgh Post-Gazette dubbed Back to the Future Now an "excellent sampler". Country Standard Time's George Hauenstein described the album as a "thoroughly enjoyable recording includ[ing] 12 of AATW's most popular songs".

Indianapolis Star writer Steve Hall was much more critical, complaining that "Most concert recordings bristle with energy; Back to the Future Now suggests that Ray Benson and his band should have slurped up a few pots of espresso before hitting the stage at Arizona Charlie's. Dan Fogelberg with two broken legs and a serious head cold would exude more liveliness. If Asleep at the Wheel was any more laid-back here, its name would be all too appropriate."

At the 40th Annual Grammy Awards, Asleep at the Wheel received a nomination in the category of Best Country Instrumental Performance for the song "Fat Boy Rag".

Track listing

Personnel

Asleep at the Wheel
Ray Benson – vocals, lead guitar, production, mixing
Cindy Cashdollar – steel guitar
David Miller – bass, backing vocals
David Sanger – drums
Jason Roberts – fiddle, mandolin, backing vocals
Chris Booher – fiddle
Michael Francis – saxophone

Guest performers
LeRoy Preston – vocals, rhythm guitar
Chris O'Connell – vocals
The McGuire Sisters – vocals
Lucky Oceans – steel guitar
Tony Garnier – bass
Floyd Domino – piano
Tim Alexander – piano, backing vocals
Johnny Lee Carpenter – fiddle
Tracy Byrd – vocals 
Wade Hayes – vocals and lead guitar 

Production personnel
Blake Chancey – production
Larry Seyer – engineering, mixing
Allen Crider – engineering
David Gratz – engineering
Frank Campbell – engineering
Don Cobb – digital editing
Carlos Grier – digital editing
Denny Purcell – mastering

References

External links

Asleep at the Wheel albums
1997 live albums
Epic Records live albums
Albums produced by Blake Chancey